Péter Bikár (born 5 November 1945) is a Hungarian former ice hockey player. He played for the Hungarian national team at the 1964 Winter Olympics and several World Championships.

References

External links
 

1945 births
Ferencvárosi TC (ice hockey) players
Hungarian ice hockey centres
Ice hockey players at the 1964 Winter Olympics
Olympic ice hockey players of Hungary
Ice hockey people from Budapest
Living people